The City of Comrades is a lost 1919 American silent drama film directed by Harry Beaumont with Tom Moore and Seena Owen in the leads. It was produced by Sam Goldwyn and released by Goldwyn Pictures.

Cast
Tom Moore as Frank Melbury
Seena Owen as Regina Barry
Otto Hoffman as Lovey
Alan Roscoe as Dr. Stephen Cantyre (credited as Albert Roscoe)
Alec B. Francis as Andy Christian
Ralph Walker as Ralph Coningsby
Mary Warren as Elsie Coningsby
Kate Lester as Mrs. Sterling Barry

References

External links

1919 films
American silent feature films
American black-and-white films
Films directed by Harry Beaumont
Goldwyn Pictures films
Films based on Canadian novels
Lost American films
1919 drama films
Silent American drama films
1919 short films
Lost drama films
1910s American films